Events from the year 1988 in Sweden

Incumbents
 Monarch – Carl XVI Gustaf
 Prime Minister – Ingvar Carlsson

Events
1 April – Vålådalen Nature Reserve established
18 September – Swedish general election. Ingvar Carlsson remains Prime Minister of Sweden

Popular culture

Film
1 February – The 23rd Guldbagge Awards were presented
19 August – Katinka released
4 November – Back to Ararat released

Sport
12–14 August – The 1988 Swedish motorcycle Grand Prix

Births

6 March – Agnes Carlsson, singer
5 April – Sissela Nordling Blanco, politician
7 June – Tobias Arwidson, biathlete
15 June – Jennie Johansson, swimmer
3 July – Sofia Engström, ice hockey player
26 August – Erik Hassle, singer-songwriter
22 September – Max Salminen, sailor.
24 September – Joline Höstman, swimmer
3 October – Alicia Vikander, actress 
11 October – Camilla Hansson, fashion model
17 October – Emma Samuelsson, fencer.
24 October – Emilia Fahlin, cyclist

Deaths

7 March – Olof Stahre, horse rider, Olympic champion (born 1909).
15 March – Thord Flodqvist, ice hockey player (born 1926).
29 March – Thage Brauer, high jumper (born 1894)
5 April – Alf Kjellin, film actor and director (born 1920)
23 April – Axel Grönberg, wrestler (born 1918)
24 May – Gustav Åkerman, Swedish army officer (born 1901)
27 May – Hjördis Petterson, actress (born 1908)
15 July – Tore Keller, football player (born 1905)

References

 
Sweden
Years of the 20th century in Sweden